Colonel Wolodyjowski is a 1969 Polish historical drama film directed by Jerzy Hoffman. The film is based on the novel Pan Wołodyjowski, by the Polish writer and Nobel laureate Henryk Sienkiewicz. The film was also serialized on Polish television, as The Adventures of Sir Michael (Polish: Przygody pana Michała).

It was entered in the 6th Moscow International Film Festival, where Tadeusz Łomnicki won the award for Best Actor.

The story is set during the Ottoman Empire's invasion of Poland in 1668–1672.

Cast
 Tadeusz Łomnicki as Jerzy Michał Wołodyjowski 
 Magdalena Zawadzka as Basia 
 Mieczysław Pawlikowski as Onufry Zagłoba
 Hanka Bielicka as Makowiecka 
 Barbara Brylska as Krzysia Drohojowska 
 Irena Karel as Ewa Nowowiejska 
 Jan Nowicki as Ketling Hassling of Elgin 
 Daniel Olbrychski as Azja Tuhaj-Bejowicz 
 Marek Perepeczko as Adam Nowowiejski 
 Mariusz Dmochowski as Jan Sobieski 
 Władysław Hańcza as Nowowiejski 
 Gustaw Lutkiewicz as Lusnia 
 Tadeusz Schmidt as Snitko 
 Andrzej Szczepkowski as Bishop Lanckoroński 
 Leonard Andrzejewski as Halim
 Bogusz Bilewski as Officer 
 Wiktor Grotowicz as Potocki 
 Tadeusz Kosudarski as Nobleman 
 Andrzej Piątkowski as Turk 
 Ryszard Ronczewski as Bandit 
 Tadeusz Somogi as Envoy 
 Witold Skaruch as Monk

See also
 With Fire and Sword
 The Deluge

References

External links
IMDB entry

1969 films
1960s Polish-language films
Films based on Polish novels
Films based on works by Henryk Sienkiewicz
Films directed by Jerzy Hoffman
1969 drama films
Polish drama films